The Hunter from Roteck (German: Der Jäger vom Roteck) is a 1956 West German drama film directed by Hermann Kugelstadt and starring Michael Cramer, Doris Kirchner and Oskar Sima. It is a heimatfilm, made when the genre was at its peak.

It was shot at the Göttingen Studios in Lower Saxony, Germany. The film's sets were designed by the art directors Walter Blokesch and Curt Stallmach.

Cast
 Michael Cramer as Bert Steiner	
 Doris Kirchner as Johanna	
 Oskar Sima as Attenberger	
 Heinz Engelmann as Matthias Feldner	
 Petra Peters as Christl, Sennerin		
 Emmerich Schrenk	as Georg Rüst
 Beppo Brem as	Jadriga	
 Lucie Englisch as	 Mutter Attenberger
 Ado Riegler as Forstwart

References

Bibliography
 Meier, Gustav. Filmstadt Göttingen: Bilder für eine neue Welt? : zur Geschichte der Göttinger Spielfilmproduktion 1945 bis 1961. Reichold, 1996.

External links 
 

1956 films
1956 drama films
German drama films
West German films
1950s German-language films
Films directed by Hermann Kugelstadt
Films based on German novels
1950s German films
Films shot at Göttingen Studios
German black-and-white films